Patrick John Savage is a New Zealand judge who served as Chief Justice of Niue from 2010 to 2018.

Savage has previously served as a Crown Solicitor in the Bay of Plenty. In 1995 he was appointed as Judge of the Māori Land Court. He has also served on the Waitangi Tribunal. He was sworn in as a Judge of the High Court of Niue on 10 September 2007. and as Chief Justice on 10 September 2010, replacing Heta Hingston. He was succeeded as Chief Justice of Niue on 22 November 2018 by Craig Coxhead.

References

New Zealand judges on the courts of Niue
Living people
Year of birth missing (living people)
Māori Land Court judges
People from the Bay of Plenty Region
Chief justices of Niue
20th-century New Zealand judges
Members of the Waitangi Tribunal
High Court of the Cook Islands judges
21st-century New Zealand judges